9951 Tyrannosaurus, provisional designation , is a stony Vestian asteroid from the inner regions of the asteroid belt, approximately 17 kilometers in diameter. It was discovered on 15 November 1990, by Belgian astronomer Eric Elst at ESO's La Silla Observatory in northern Chile. It was named after Tyrannosaurus, a genus of dinosaurs.

Classification and orbit 

Based on the Hierarchical Clustering Method, Tyrannosaurus is a member of the Vesta family, which is named after its parent 4 Vesta, the main belt's second-largest and second-most-massive body after Ceres.

Tyrannosaurus orbits the Sun in the inner main-belt at a distance of 2.1–2.7 AU once every 3 years and 9 months (1,380 days). Its orbit has an eccentricity of 0.12 and an inclination of 7° with respect to the ecliptic.

Physical characteristics 

Tyrannosaurus has been characterized as a common S-type asteroid. The overall spectral type for members of the Vesta family is that of a V-type. Vestian asteroids have a composition akin to cumulate eucrites (HED meteorites) and are thought to have originated deep within 4 Vesta's crust, possibly from the Rheasilvia crater, a large impact crater on its southern hemisphere near the South pole, formed as a result of a subcatastrophic collision.

Diameter and albedo 

According to the survey carried out by the Infrared Astronomical Satellite IRAS, Tyrannosaurus measures 17 kilometers in diameter. Spectroscopic observations indicate that it is a stony S-type asteroid, the most abundant spectral class of asteroids in the inner main-belt. It has an absolute magnitude of 14.2.

Lightcurves 

As of 2017, no rotational lightcurve of Tyrannosaurus has been obtained. The asteroid's rotation period, poles and shape remain unknown.

Naming 

This minor planet was named for Tyrannosaurus, a large and heavy bipedal carnivorous dinosaur, that lived in the upper cretaceous. It was one of the most terrifying predators, with a large skull, massive jaws and sharp teeth. Adult individuals were 12 meters long and 4–7 meters high. Tyrannosaurus rex is the best known species of this genus. The official naming citation was published by the Minor Planet Center on 20 November 2002.

References

External links 
 Asteroid/Comet News, Columbine, Inc., November 2002
 Asteroid Lightcurve Database (LCDB), query form (info )
 Dictionary of Minor Planet Names, Google books
 Asteroids and comets rotation curves, CdR – Observatoire de Genève, Raoul Behrend
 Discovery Circumstances: Numbered Minor Planets (5001)-(10000) – Minor Planet Center
 
 

009951
Discoveries by Eric Walter Elst
Named minor planets
009951
19901115